Saleem Bhatti is a British computer scientist who is one of the leading voices in the development of ILNP. He is a professor of computer science in the School of Computer Science at the University of St Andrews.

He is known for his work on ILNP which is expected to replace IPv6 as the main Internet communication protocol.

Supervisor 
He has acted as supervisor for PhD students including Ryo Yanagida, Samuel J. Ivey and Gregor Haywood.

References

External links 
https://ilnp.cs.st-andrews.ac.uk

British computer scientists
Living people
Year of birth missing (living people)